Stay Human may refer to:

 Stay Human (band), a band founded by American musician Jon Batiste
 Stay Human (album), a 2001 studio album by Michael Franti & Spearhead
 Dying Light 2: Stay Human, a 2022 video game